Alexander Holtmann (born 19 August 1978) is a Finnish-German cinema, television and theatre actor known for his characters in Humboldt in Mexico, The Chosen, Capadocia, El Señor de los Cielos, Qué bonito amor, Fortuna, La Patrona amongst others.

Early life
Holtmann was born in Bad Segeberg, West Germany, to a Finnish mother and German father.

Training 

 Acting Technique - Irene Gilbert, Stella Adler Academy
 Scene Study - Charles Waxberg, Stacy Ray
 Script Analysis - Charles Waxberg
 Stage Combat - Louis Roth
 Improvisation - Dan Weisman, Pat Dade
 Sketch - Kent Skov, L.A. Connection
 Shakespeare - Debbie Wastling
 Chekhov - Yevgeni Lazarev

Special skills 

 Languages - English, German, Finnish, Spanish, Swedish
 Sports - PADI Rescue Diver, Paintball, Volleyball, Ping Pong, Biking, Squash, Horseback riding
 Martial Arts - Jiu-Jitsu, Aikido, Stage combat, Fencing
 Military Training - Field Medic, Ambulance Driver, Automatic and Semiautomatic Weapons
 Drivers License C1E (Truck-European Union)

Filmography

Film
 Humboldt, the Gaze of the Explorer - Ana Cruz Navarro
La gran promesa - Dir. Jorge Ramírez
 The Chosen - Dir. Antonio Chavarrías
 El sueño del Marakame - Dir. Federico Cecchetti
 Quack - Dir. Eduardo Perea
 Lalito - Contrabajo Films
 The Boy Who Smells Like Fish, Treading Water - Dir. Analeine Cal y Mayor
 In Lak'ech Ala K'in: Code of the Heart - Dir. Catherine Cunningham
 Toda la suerte del mundo - Dir. Alberto Allende              
 La Brujula la lleva el Muerto - Dir. Arturo Pons          
 Zeviathan - Dir. Iker Orozco                                            
 Los Trashumantes - Dir. Federico Cecchetti
 Matriushkas - Dir. Luciana Solórzano
 Los Pajarracos - Dir. Horacio Rivera, Héctor Hernández                                   
 Kiljusten herrasvaen uudet seikkailut - Polarfilms

Television

 El Dragón- Hans Prinket/ Lemon Studios
 El Chema -  Lesly Carrol / Telemundo
 Señora Acero - John Floyd - Telemundo
Grandes Transformaciones de México  - Maximiliano de Habsburgo - Televisa
El Hotel de los secretos - Sheamus Rangel - Roberto Gómez Fernández, Televisa
Amor de Barrio - Walter - Roberto Hernández Vázquez, Televisa
 Coleccionista - Maximiliano de Habsburgo - OPMA
 Alguién más - Maestro Kanvar - Canana Films y Canal Once (Mexico)
 Las trampas del deseo - Humberto - Argos Comunicación y MundoFox
 Fortuna - Luka Gomorov - Argos Comunicación y Cadena Tres
 El Señor de los Cielos - Randy Prescott - Argos Comunicación y Telemundo
 Locked up abroad /Howard Marks - Patrick Lane - National Geographic Channel
 La Patrona - Arthur Kelley - Argos Comunicación y Telemundo
 Que Bonito Amor - Arnold Smith - Salvador Mejía Alejandre, Televisa
 Capadocia 3 - Carter - Argos Comunicación
 Infames - Mayor Richard Davis - Argos Comunicación y Cadena Tres
 La Teniente - Ambassador McKenzie - Azteca 7, TV Azteca
 El Encanto del Aguila - Second Lt. Charles Copp - Canal de las Estrellas, Televisa
 Los Minondo - Partner 1 - Canal Once (Mexico)
 Drenaje Profundo - Michael Hudson young - TV Azteca
 XY 2 - Private secretary - Canal Once (Mexico)

Theatre
 Humboldt, México para los mexicanos - Ernesto Anaya Ottone/ Teatro sin paredes
 Angustia/ A puerta cerrada - Jean-Paul Sartre
 Acreedores - August Strindberg
 Güero en México - stand up Alexander Holtmann
 Choros Criticos - stand up Alexander Holtmann / Blanca Salces
 The Proposal - Anton Chekhov
 The Jubilee - Anton Chekhov
 The Bear - Anton Chekhov
 Pygmalion - G.Bernard Shaw
 Two Gentlemen of Verona - G.Bernard Shaw
 The Taming of the Shrew - William Shakespeare
 A Christmas Carol - Charles Dickens
 The Nutcracker - E. T. A. Hoffmann
 Platero and Me - Juan Ramón Jiménez
 The Swan Lake - Pyotr Ilyich Tchaikovsky
 Don Quijote - Miguel de Cervantes
 Little Red Ridinghood - Charles Perrault
 Cinderella - Charles Perrault
 Sleeping Beauty - Charles Perrault
 Pastorela - Cesar Chavez Belmont
 Instant Comedy Soup - Stella Adler Theatre L.A.
 A little bit of Improv - Studio Theatre L.A.
 IMPROV! - Irene Gilbert Theatre L.A.
 ImproVable Cause - Jewel Box Theatre L.A.
 Sketch & Improv - L.A Connection, Dan Weisman

References
 http://www.alexanderholtmann.com 
 https://www.imdb.com/name/nm2319152/?ref_=fn_al_nm_1 
 https://www.facebook.com/AlexanderHoltmann.Actor
 http://www.eluniversal.com.mx/articulo/cultura/2016/05/14/las-travesias-de-humboldt-en-mexico-al-cine
 http://www.proceso.com.mx/408863/actualidades-teatrales-humboldt-mexico-para-los-mexicanos
 http://www.e-xtension.com.mx/index.php/2016/06/01/desmitifican-multiculturalidad-contemporanea-de-mexico-en-el-escenario/
 https://www.youtube.com/watch?v=PNihmOGRFq4
 https://web.archive.org/web/20160815231243/http://alairelarevista.com.mx/index.php/en/cinescopio/item/alexander-holtmann-rompe-paradigmas
 http://www.imgrum.net/media/1005869051214949212_5813705
 http://docplayer.es/6289468-Entre-risas-anda-el-juego.html
http://www.humboldtenmexico.com/

Notes

External links 
 Alexander Holtmann Website
 

Living people
1978 births
Finnish expatriates in Mexico
Finnish male actors
Finnish people of German descent
German expatriates in Mexico
German male actors
German people of Finnish descent
People from Segeberg